Molinier is a surname, and may refer to:

Auguste Molinier (1851–1904), French historian
Émile Molinier (1857–1906), younger brother of the former, curator and art historian
Pierre Molinier (1900–1976), French painter, photographer and "maker of objects"
Raymond Molinier (1904–1994), French communist politician

See also 
Molinier (baritone), stage name of opera singer François Gély (1807–1859)